Operation Desert Hawk was the codename of a military operation planned and executed by the Pakistan Army in the Rann of Kutch area, the disputed area which was under Indian control from the long-standing status quo. The boundary of Rann of Kutch was one of the few un-demarcated boundaries pending since the 1947 partition of India.

Background 
The Rann of Kutch (alternately spelled as Kuchchh) is a large area of salt marshes that span the border between India and Pakistan. The area was originally part of the princely state of Kutch, which was acceded to India in present-day Kutch region of Gujarat. Both countries maintained few armed police posts scattered along the border.

Objectives 
Pakistan planned to serve several purposes through this operation. First was to assess the response of the Indian government and military, which was relatively unstable under the governance of Prime Minister Lal Bahadur Shastri after the death of India's first Prime minister Jawaharlal Nehru in 1964 and the loss in the 1962 Sino-Indian war. The second objective was to draw Indian armor southward to Kutch, away from the Punjab and Kashmir region. One of the objectives was to test the United States' protest over the use of US-supplied military equipment against the India, which was a violation of Pakistan's commitment. The Pakistan Army also got a rehearsal opportunity for the planned invasion of India later the same year.

Operation 
In January 1965, Pakistan claimed the area of Rann of Kutch on the basis of the Sindh province. Pakistan's paramilitary force Indus Rangers started activity and took control over the ruined fort of Kanjarkot located on the north-west fringe of the Rann, Pakistani Indus Rangers started patrolling below the Indian claimed line by January 1965 and occupied an Indian police post near the Kanjarkot fort, which was in violation of the long-standing status quo. 

The region's terrain and communication network and logistics was favorable to Pakistan with all the approaches to the Rann of Kutch from the Indian side being more difficult than from Pakistan. The Pakistani railway station situated at Badin was 26 miles north of the Indian claim line and Karachi was 113 miles east from the Badin, where the Pakistan Army's 8 Division was based. Pakistan was able to move the troops quickly and easily along the border line. The nearest Indian railway station at Bhuj was located 110 miles from the border and the nearest Indian Army formation, 31 Infantry Brigade situated at Ahmedabad, was 160 miles east of Bhuj railway station.

In February 1965, bilateral talks for the negotiation failed. 

The Pakistan Army, equipped with US-made Patton tanks, struck the Indian forces on 9th April. Pakistan launched a major offensive on the Sardar post comprising a brigade strength.

On 24 April, Pakistan launched "Operation Desert Hawk" a decisive thrust towards the Indian posts in the area deploying an infantry division and two armored regiments equipped with Patton tanks and field guns. The Pakistan Army captured four more posts and claimed the whole Kanjarkot stretch. With poor logistics and inferior military hardware, India had no other option than to retreat after offering decent resistance.

Ceasefire 
The British Prime Minister Herold Wilson proposed a ceasefire on 28 April. Both countries signed an agreement to settle the disputed border through international arbitration by the International Court of Justice on 30 June 1965. The ceasefire became effective on 1 July 1965. India and Pakistan both agreed to demarcate the border by a three-member arbitration committee. The possibility of the armed conflict escalation was avoided by the active interventions of the British Prime Minister and the United Nations' Secretary-General. Both nations withdrew all troops from the disputed and held areas after the peace talks as of june 30 and a pre-conflict status as of January 1965 was established. The dispute later on went for Indo-Pakistan Western Boundary Case Tribunal and was solved in 1968

Aftermath 

The Pakistan Army decision makers assessed the Indian Army's strength and capability based on the minor success in the Rann of Kutch area and headed towards their next planned execution of Operation Gibraltar in August 1965.

Despite India's repeated protests against the use of US-made weaponry by Pakistan against India, the President of the United States Lyndon B. Johnson took no effective action against Pakistan. 

This attack exposed the inadequacy of the Indian State Armed Police to cope with armed aggression. So after the end of the 1965 war, the government of India formed the Border Security Force as a unified central agency with the specific mandate of guarding India's international boundaries. The Border Security Force came into formal existence on 1 December 1965.

See also

 Indo-Pakistan Wars
 Lahore Front

References

Battles of Indo-Pakistani wars
Indo-Pakistani War of 1965
April 1965 events in Asia
India–Pakistan border
India–Pakistan military relations
Indo-Pakistani wars